Bumphen Chomvith (born 21 February 1922) was a Thai sailor. He competed in the Star event at the 1960 Summer Olympics.

References

External links
 

1922 births
Possibly living people
Bumphen Chomvith
Bumphen Chomvith
Sailors at the 1960 Summer Olympics – Star
Bumphen Chomvith
Bumphen Chomvith